BSAT-2a, was a geostationary communications satellite operated by B-SAT which was designed and manufactured by Orbital Sciences Corporation on the STAR-1 platform. It was stationed on the 110° East orbital slot along its companion BSAT-2c from where they provided redundant high definition direct television broadcasting across Japan.

Satellite description
BSAT-2a was designed and manufactured by Orbital Sciences Corporation on the STAR-1 satellite bus for B-SAT. As all four STAR-1 satellites, it had a solid rocket Star 30CBP apogee kick motor for orbit raising, plus  of propellant for its liquid propellant station keeping thrusters.

It measured  when stowed for launch. Its dual wing solar panels can generate 2.6 kW of power at the beginning of its design life, and span  when fully deployed.

It has a single Ku band payload with four active transponders plus four spares with a TWTA output power of 130 Watts.

History
In March 1999, B-SAT ordered from Orbital Sciences Corporation two satellites based on the STAR-1 platform: BSAT-2a and BSAT-2b. This was the second order of the bus and the first since Orbital had acquired CTA Space Systems, the original developer.

BSAT-2a was launched aboard an Ariane 5G at 22:51 UTC, March 8, 2001, from Guiana Space Center ELA-3. It rode on the lower berth below Eurobird. On April 26, BSAT-2a was commissioned into service starting the broadcast of digital signals.

B-SAT ended the broadcast of analog television in July 2011. During January 2013, BSAT-2a was sent to a graveyard orbit and decommissioned.

References

Communications satellites in geostationary orbit
Satellites using the GEOStar bus
Spacecraft launched in 2001
Communications satellites of Japan
Satellites of Japan